The Boy Standing by the Crematory (alternatively The Standing Boy of Nagasaki) is a historic photograph taken in Nagasaki, Japan, in September of 1945, shortly after the atomic bombing of that city on August 9, 1945. The photograph is of a boy of about 10 with his dead baby brother strapped to his back, waiting for his turn at the crematorium.

The photograph was taken by Joe O'Donnell, then working for the United States Marine Corps. 

O'Donnell made personal copies of his Nagasaki photographs and kept them hidden in a trunk until 1989, when he put together a traveling exhibit and a book. O'Donnell's Japan 1945, Images From the Trunk was published in Japan in 1995 and read widely.

Efforts to determine the boy's identity
In 1979, Yoshitoshi Fukahori, who had been near the bombing and was still haunted by trauma from the events, began a lifelong effort of collecting photographs of the immediate aftermath. When he saw the photograph of the boy, Fukahori began an effort to determine the boy's identity. He ultimately failed, but the photograph was also seen by one Masanori Muraoka. 

Muraoka believed that he recognized the boy as a childhood playmate, although he had forgotten or never knew the boy's name. He also believed that he had met the boy after the bombing, carrying his dead brother on his back, and explaining "My mother isn't here". Muraoka undertook his own investigation to determine the boy's identity. Muraoka found a few minor possible clues, but he also failed, although he kept an extensive notebook of his efforts.

A 50-minute documentary film, Searching for the Standing Boy of Nagasaki ('焼き場に立つ少年'をさがして), was produced by NHK and released on August 8, 2020. The film described these efforts (as well as the experiences of "atomic bomb orphans" generally). In 2021, the film was distributed in America by American Public Television.

Further reading

References

1945 photographs
Photographs of children in war
World War II photographs
Black-and-white photographs
Works about the atomic bombings of Hiroshima and Nagasaki
Unidentified people
Hibakusha